Shackelford County is a county located in the U.S. state of Texas. As of the 2020 census, its population was 3,105. Its county seat is Albany. The county was created in 1858 and later organized in 1874. Shackelford is named for Dr. Jack Shackelford, a Virginia physician who equipped soldiers at his own expense to fight in the Texas Revolution.

Historic Fort Griffin, established in 1867, lies within Shackelford County.

During the last two weekends of June, the Fort Griffin Fandangle, a western musical production, is presented by Shackelford County residents  in the Prairie Theater in Albany. The content of the program is changed each year. Begun in 1938, it is billed as "Texas' Oldest Outdoor Musical".

Geography

Major highways
  U.S. Highway 180
  U.S. Highway 283
  State Highway 6
  State Highway 351

Adjacent counties
 Throckmorton County (north)
 Stephens County (east)
 Eastland County (southeast)
 Callahan County (south)
 Jones County (west)
 Haskell County (northwest)
 Taylor County (southwest)

Demographics

Note: the US Census treats Hispanic/Latino as an ethnic category. This table excludes Latinos from the racial categories and assigns them to a separate category. Hispanics/Latinos can be of any race.

As of the census of 2000, there were 3,302 people, 1,300 households, and 941 families residing in the county.  The population density was 4 people per square mile (1/km2).  There were 1,613 housing units at an average density of 2 per square mile (1/km2).  The racial makeup of the county was 94.22% White, 0.48% Black or African American, 0.42% Native American, 4.24% from other races, and 0.64% from two or more races.  7.60% of the population were Hispanic or Latino of any race.

There were 1,300 households, out of which 32.80% had children under the age of 18 living with them, 60.90% were married couples living together, 8.70% had a female householder with no husband present, and 27.60% were non-families. 26.20% of all households were made up of individuals, and 14.60% had someone living alone who was 65 years of age or older.  The average household size was 2.49 and the average family size was 3.02.

In the county, the population was spread out, with 26.70% under the age of 18, 6.00% from 18 to 24, 24.80% from 25 to 44, 24.30% from 45 to 64, and 18.20% who were 65 years of age or older.  The median age was 40 years. For every 100 females there were 90.10 males.  For every 100 females age 18 and over, there were 85.50 males.

The median income for a household in the county was $30,479, and the median income for a family was $38,447. Males had a median income of $26,953 versus $19,766 for females. The per capita income for the county was $16,341.  About 10.90% of families and 13.60% of the population were below the poverty line, including 15.80% of those under age 18 and 16.90% of those age 65 or over.

Education
Shackelford County includes these school districts:
 Lueders-Avoca Independent School District
 Albany Independent School District
 Moran Independent School District

Communities
 Albany (county seat)
 Lueders (mostly in Jones County)
 Moran

See also

 National Register of Historic Places listings in Shackelford County, Texas
 Recorded Texas Historic Landmarks in Shackelford County

Politics

References

External links

 
 Texas Genealogy & History
 Shackelford County Government Website
 Shackelford County Profile from the Texas Association of Counties

 
1874 establishments in Texas
Populated places established in 1874